Statistics of Czechoslovak First League in the 1925 season. Jan Vaník was the league's top scorer with 13 goals.

Overview
It was contested by 10 teams, and Slavia Prague won the championship.

League standings

Results

Top goalscorers

References

Czechoslovakia - List of final tables (RSSSF)

Czechoslovak First League seasons
1
Czech